Justin Rogers (born January 16, 1988) is a former Gridiron football cornerback. He was drafted by the Buffalo Bills in the seventh round of the 2011 NFL Draft. He played college football for the Richmond Spiders. He has also played for Houston Texans, Miami Dolphins, and Kansas City Chiefs.

Professional career

Buffalo Bills
Rogers was drafted by the Buffalo Bills in 2011 NFL Draft. He had three interceptions in his three years with the Bills. He was released on November 19, 2013.

Houston Texans
Texans signed Rogers on November 20, 2013. He was released on November 29, 2013.

Miami Dolphins
The Miami Dolphins signed Rogers on December 10, 2013. He was waived on December 19, 2013.

Kansas City Chiefs
Rogers signed with the Kansas City Chiefs on June 5, 2014. He was released on August 30, 2014.

Washington Redskins
Rogers signed with the Washington Redskins on December 10, 2014.

On September 29, 2015, he was placed on injured reserve due to a plantar fascia tear in his right foot.

On October 8, 2015, he was cut from the team.

References 

1988 births
Living people
American football cornerbacks
Buffalo Bills players
Hamilton Tiger-Cats players
Houston Texans players
Kansas City Chiefs players
Miami Dolphins players
Richmond Spiders football players
Washington Redskins players
Players of American football from Baton Rouge, Louisiana